List of Women's Basketball Academic All-America Team Members of the Year is a list of the annual selection by College Sports Communicators (known before 2022–23 as the College Sports Information Directors of America, or CcSIDA) and its Academic All-America sponsor of the individual athlete selected as the most outstanding of the annual Women's Basketball Academic All-America selections. From 1996 through 2011, one winner each was chosen from both the College and University Divisions for all twelve Academic All-America teams, including football. The Academic All-America program recognizes combined athletic and academic excellence of the nation's top student-athletes.  The University Division team included eligible participants from National Collegiate Athletic Association (NCAA) Division I member schools, while the College Division team included scholar-athletes from all of the following: NCAA Division II, NCAA Division III, National Association of Intercollegiate Athletics (NAIA), Canadian universities and colleges and two-year schools.

Beginning in 2012, CoSIDA revamped its award structure. The University Division was renamed "Division I". Since then, NCAA Divisions II and III have had their own separate All-Americans. The College Division consisted only of non-NCAA institutions through the 2017–18 school year, after which it was effectively replaced by an NAIA division restricted to members of that governing body.

Currently, each team selects Academic All-District honorees in eight geographic districts across the United States and Canada.  First team All-District honorees make the All-America team ballots. Currently, all twelve Academic All-American teams (Men's and women's basketball, men's and women's soccer, men's and women's track & field, men's baseball, women's softball, men's American football, women's volleyball and men's and women's at-large teams) have one Academic All-American of the Year for each division. One of these twelve sport-by-sport Academic All-American of the year is selected as the Academic All-America Team Members of the Year for each division. The most recent women's basketball player to have earned the all-sports honor is Grace Barry of Concordia University Nebraska, winner of the 2020 NAIA award.

University Division/Division I
All winners are Americans unless indicated otherwise. Names in bold were winners of the all-sports Academic All-America Award.

Division II

Division III

College Division/NAIA

Footnotes

References

External links
Academic All-America information page

College basketball trophies and awards in the United States
women's Basketball
Sports awards honoring women
Lists of women's basketball players in the United States